American former professional racquetball player, now a touring comedian, ventriloquist, magician and illusionist

Andy Gross (born Andrew Gross on May 10, 1968) is an American former professional racquetball player, now a touring comedian, ventriloquist, magician and illusionist. He is known for his television and film appearances, and for his live touring show called Andy Gross's MindBoggling Variety Show.

Life and career
Gross was born in St. Louis, Missouri, to Marshall and Joan Gross, where he attended Parkway Central High School. At 15, Gross became the youngest professional racquetball player in the history of the sport, winning a record number of Southern California tournaments in the years leading up to his retirement at the age of 26.

Following his athletic career, Gross established himself as an entertainer, creating a live act that combines comedy, ventriloquism, and magic.  His talent as a ventriloquist has been put to use in television series such as Beverly Hills, 90210 and Las Vegas, as well as in the sci-fi Web series After Judgment.

Since 2000, Gross has toured the United States with his MindBoggling Variety Show, which combines his comedy, magic, and ventriloquism with large-scale stage illusions.  Among the more notable ventriloquist's dummy characters in the stage act is Steve, The Customer Service Guy, a soft puppet who dispenses computer repair support by telephone.

In 2013, Gross created a video depicting a unique spin on the classic cut-in-half illusion that he dubs the "Split Man" trick, which makes it appear as though the entertainer has been severed in two but is still able to walk about.  The video, shot guerrilla-style in various public places in which unsuspecting passersby are jarred by the sudden appearance of his 'Split Man,' premiered on the Web before being showcased on a variety of national platforms.

Gross owns a sizeable and significant collection of ventriloquist dummies and memorabilia, which frequently supplies props for television, film, and stage productions.  Additionally, since 1997, he has designed a line of toys, prank novelties, and magic tricks, having won the Top 10 Duracell Kids Choice Award for one of his designs.

In August 2018, Gross sparked controversy at Purdue University during his performance at the freshman orientation closing ceremony. Gross made a joke about being sexually aroused by a female student touching his thigh after telling her to “press up against me back to back, cheek to cheek,” when he stated that he "got a free feel out of it" near the end of his opening act. In addition, he made continual sexual comments that many students interpreted as sexual harassment. One of these comments included an insinuation that the female student's proximity to him gave him an erection, with Gross exclaiming "let me out," in reference to his genitals. These actions prompted a great deal of backlash from students, with many protesting in the form of a walkout during the performance. Gross decided to no longer perform on college campuses.

Filmography

References

External links 

Living people
American stand-up comedians
Ventriloquists
American magicians
American male television actors
1968 births
Comedians from Missouri
21st-century American comedians